Brian Kerwin (born October 25, 1949) is an American actor who has starred in feature films, on Broadway, and television series and movies.

Life
Kerwin was born in Chicago and raised in Flossmoor, Illinois. He has three siblings: Anne, Dennis, and Terrence. 

Kerwin married Jeanne Marie Troy on September 2, 1990, with whom he had three children: Finn, Matilda, and Brennan. She died on February 11, 2016, after a three-year battle with brain cancer.

Career 
Kerwin won the Theatre World Award in 1988 for the off-Broadway play Emily. His Broadway credits include the 1997 revival of The Little Foxes and the Elaine May comedy After the Night and the Music in 2005. The same year, he starred in Edward Albee's The Goat or Who Is Sylvia? at the Mark Taper Forum.

In 1989, he played Nick in a revival of Albee's Who's Afraid of Virginia Woolf? at the Doolittle Theatre (now the Ricardo Montalbán Theatre) in Los Angeles. The production, directed by the playwright, starred Glenda Jackson and John Lithgow, with Cynthia Nixon as Kerwin's  character's wife, Honey. The production was not well received. He played opposite Kathy Baker in the South Coast Repertory production of The Man from Nebraska in 2006. His most recent stage appearance was in the original Broadway production of August: Osage County.

Kerwin's feature films include Murphy's Romance, Hard Promises, 27 Dresses (as Katherine Heigl's character's father), Torch Song Trilogy, Love Field, Gold Diggers: The Secret of Bear Mountain, Jack, King Kong Lives, The Myth of Fingerprints, and Debating Robert Lee. Kerwin has enjoyed an extensive career in television, beginning with the daytime serial The Young and the Restless in 1976.

His credits on TV include a regular role on the Showtime series Beggars and Choosers, recurring roles on The Misadventures of Sheriff Lobo, The Chisholms (four episodes), Roseanne (as Gary Hall), The West Wing, Nip/Tuck and Big Love and guest appearances in The Love Boat, Simon & Simon, Highway to Heaven, Murder, She Wrote, St. Elsewhere, Frasier, Law & Order, Law & Order: Special Victims Unit, Blue Bloods, Boston Legal, Medium, Without a Trace, and Desperate Housewives. From 2007 to 2012, he appeared on the soap opera One Life to Live.

Filmography

Film

Television

References

External links

1949 births
Living people
American male film actors
American male stage actors
American male television actors
Lee Strasberg Theatre and Film Institute alumni
Male actors from Chicago
People from Flossmoor, Illinois
20th-century American male actors